This is a list of GIS data sources (including some geoportals) that provide information sets that can be used in geographic information systems (GIS) and spatial databases for purposes of geospatial analysis and cartographic mapping. This list categorizes the sources of interest.

Global

Polar region

Europe

Europe by country 

Cyprus

Czech Republic

Greece

Lithuania 

Czech Republic

Sweden

Brazil

Canada

Canada Regional

India

United States

United States Regional

Alabama

Alaska

Connecticut

Florida

Kentucky

Louisiana

Maryland

Pennsylvania

South Carolina

Washington State

South Africa

See also 
 Geoportal
 National lidar dataset, for a list of sources of airborne lidar datasets
 Wikipedia:Graphics Lab/Resources/GIS sources and palettes

References

Geographic information systems
Geographic data and information